Raulerson is a surname of English origin. Notable people with the surname include:

Charles Raulerson (born 1964), American golfer 
Dan Raulerson (born 1957), American politician
Jaclyn Raulerson (born 1990), American beauty pageant titleholder
Kenneth Raulerson, American bank robber
Lynn Raulerson (1937 - 2012), American plant biologist

References

Surnames of English origin